Body jewelry sizes express the thickness of an item of body jewelry, using one of several possible systems.

Background

Items of body piercing jewelry have an important common factor: the diameter of the part of the item of jewelry where it will rest in the piercing site.  With the wearing of European-traditional kinds of earrings, that thickness is not an issue, because jewelry is made to use only thin wire for support, and the wearer need only have a narrow piercing hole to accommodate it.  But with body jewelry, there is a wide variety of possible sizes, and wearers generally want jewelry that is the same size as their piercing site.  Some wearers want increasingly larger sizes to deliberately stretch the hole.  So that wearers can choose the size they want, there are standards for body jewelry sizes, used by jewelry makers and sellers.

Generally, the system of gauge-and-inches is used: In gauge notation, jewelry less than ″ thick is typically measured in a system originally devised for measuring wire thickness.  A gauge number denotes a thickness on a standardized scale which, for most purposes, starts at 20g (0.812 mm thick— often used for the posts for nose studs), and increases in thickness (as the gauge number decreases) to 0g, then 00g, and rarely goes any further as these thicknesses come closer and closer to ″.  From there, sizes of ″ and thicker are always specified in fractions of an inch.  (But note that sizes thinner than ″ are also sometimes specified as fractions of an inch; see the Conversion Table to see how these interleave with gauges.)

Even though the gauge system was originally meant for wire, it is now used regardless of whether an item of body jewelry is an actual wire, or is instead a wooden plug, a plastic ring, or any other material.

The alternative to using the gauge-and-inches system is to specify the thickness in millimeters.

Conversion table

Usage of the systems
Some jewelry makers or sellers who express the size of their jewelry in millimeters, may also list the nearest approximate gauge-and-inches measurements for each item.  Using millimeters as the primary notation is most common in Europe and Australia.

Units and notation
Discussions of gauge in this article use the American Wire Gauge (AWG) scale. Some jewelry may still use the obsolete and significantly different Standard Wire Gauge (SWG) scale instead. Both AWG and SWG express sizes as a gauge, but the numbers are different. For example, AWG 12g is 2.1 mm, but SWG 12g is 2.6 mm.  AWG 8g happens to be the same as SWG 10g.  AWG 000g is 10.4 mm, but SWG 000g is 9.4 mm.

In most discussions of body jewelry, sizes are specified by giving the gauge, usually abbreviated by the suffix "g", the same symbol as used for grams: "12g".  The article American Wire Gauge system, section "Nomenclature and abbreviations in electrical distribution" shows other notations for gauge, but most are rarely used for expressing body jewelry sizes, except "ga." as in "12 ga.", which is used occasionally.

See also
 Jewelry wire gauge
 Earring
 Body piercing
 Body piercing jewelry
 Body piercing materials
 Wire
 
 IEC 60228, the metric wire-size standard used in most parts of the world.
 American wire gauge, used primarily in the US and Canada
 Standard wire gauge, the British imperial standard BS3737, superseded by the metric.
 Stubs Iron Wire Gauge
 Circular mil, Electrical industry standard for wires larger than 4/0.
 Number 8 wire, a term used in the New Zealand vernacular

External links
 SteelNavel.com Body Piercing Jewelry Size Reference — illustrating the different ways that size is measured on different kinds of jewelry

Notes

Wire gauges
Customary units of measurement in the United States
Body piercing jewellery